Non-faradaic electrochemical modification of catalytic activity (NEMCA effect), also known as electrochemical promotion of catalysis (EPOC), is used to describe the increase in catalytic activity (up to 90-fold) and selectivity of a gas exposed electrode on a solid electrolyte cell upon application of a potential. This phenomenon is well documented and has been observed on various surfaces (Ni, Au, Pt,  Pd, IrO2, RuO2) supported by O2−, Na+ and proton conducting solid electrolytes.

See also
Heterogeneous catalysis
Electrocatalyst

References

Further reading

 

Electrochemistry